Antonio Moyano Carrasquilla (born 13 July 2000) is a Spanish footballer who plays for AD Alcorcón as a central midfielder.

Club career
Born in Montilla, Córdoba, Andalusia, Moyano represented Córdoba CF as a youth. On 4 November 2016, aged only 16, he signed his first professional contract with the club.

Moyano made his senior debut with the reserves on 16 September 2018, starting in a 2–1 Tercera División away win against Sevilla FC C. He scored his first goals on 14 October, netting a hat-trick in a 4–2 home defeat of UB Lebrijana.

Moyano made his professional debut on 31 May 2019, coming on as a second-half substitute for Yann Bodiger in a 2–3 home loss against CA Osasuna, as his side was already relegated. On 20 June, he signed a new two-year contract with the club.

In July 2021, Moyano signed for AD Alcorcón; initially assigned to the B-team in Tercera División RFEF, he impressed first team manager Juan Antonio Anquela during the pre-season and was assigned to the main squad.

References

External links

2000 births
Living people
Sportspeople from the Province of Córdoba (Spain)
Spanish footballers
Footballers from Andalusia
Association football midfielders
Segunda División players
Segunda División B players
Tercera División players
Córdoba CF B players
Córdoba CF players
AD Alcorcón footballers